Harry S. Miller (born 1867 – 20th century, date unknown) was an American lyricist, composer, and sometimes playwright who lived in New York and Chicago in the 19th and early 20th centuries and is best known for his song "The Cat Came Back", published in 1893.

Life
Born in Philadelphia in 1867 to Isaac D. Miller and Amelia Straub, Miller was the second of four brothers. He was raised in Bellefonte, Pennsylvania, and moved to New York City in 1896 to further his career as a lyricist.

Miller's songs were part of Tin Pan Alley, and were sold to various TPA entertainers (for example, vaudeville entertainer Tony Pastor popularized The Cat Came Back, Dan W. Quinn recorded He's Got Feathers in his Hat for the North American Phonograph Company around 1895, and Edward M. Favor popularized I'll Not Go Out with Reilly Any More). He specialized in quatrains and often wrote using a Georgian Black dialect, though Miller was white. His contemporaries credited him with the popularization of the terms of endearment "honey" and "baby" in African-American English and the spread of coon songs, as well as the phrase, "Got troubles of my own".

In 1898, Miller wrote The Insurance Agent: An Eccentric Character and Comedy Sketch, a two-man play.

Miller married his wife Levina and moved to Tyrone, Pennsylvania, where they gave birth to their daughter, Gladys Lucille, in 1905.

Most of his music was published by Edward Taylor Paull (and the E.T. Paull Co.), a New England publisher at the time, who also composed "He's Goin' to Hab a Hot Time Bye an' Bye" for Miller.

The date of Miller's death is unknown, but he was apparently still alive in 1908.

Works

Songs
Barney's Parting (1883)
The Cat Came Back: A Nigger Absurdity (1893)
He's Got Feather's in His Hat (1893)
If They'd Only Write and Ask Me to Come Home (1895)
Down in Hogan's Alley (1896)
He's Goin' to Hab a Hot Time Bye an' Bye (1898; music by Edward Taylor Paull)
This Wedding Cannot Be (1898)
Bring Your Money Home (1899)
Down Old New England Way (1899; music by Emily Smith)
I Loves Your Sadie, 'Deed I Do!: An Etheopian Love Song (1899; music by Charles Jerome Wilson)
I'll Not Go Out with Reilly Any More (1900)
Oh Joe, Dear Joe (1901)
The Old Virginia Home (1908; music by Emily Smith)

Many of his songs have been lost, along with their date of publication, including:

Can't Loose Me, Charlie
A Cruel Hiss
For Your Mother's Sake
I'm 17 To-day
It's All Right Now
Keep Your Eye on Duffy
Let Her Come Home Again
My Sister's Beau
Not on Your Life, Says Dolan
She's Still Your Wife
The Telephone Girl
The Waterbury Watch
When You're Single

Other
The Insurance Agent: An Eccentric Character and Comedy Sketch (1898)

See also
Coon song
Tin Pan Alley

External links
 NYPL: 79 Miller music images
 'Cat Came Back' music (1893) & lyrics (dialectal)

References 

American male composers
American composers
American lyricists
1867 births
20th-century deaths
Musicians from Philadelphia
People from Bellefonte, Pennsylvania